Armington as a personal name can refer to:
Mariano Laya Armington
Paul Armington, economist

Armington as a place name can refer to:
Armington, Illinois

Armington as an economic term can refer to:
Armington elasticity